Grado is a town and comune of 8,064 residents in the north-eastern Italian region of Friuli-Venezia Giulia, located on an island and adjacent peninsula of the Adriatic Sea between Venice and Trieste. The territory of the municipality of Grado extends between the mouth of the Isonzo and the Adriatic Sea and the lagoon of the same name which covers an area of about 90 square kilometers and goes from Porto Buso to Fossalon. Characteristic of the lagoon is the presence of the casoni, which are simple houses with thatched roof used in the past by the fishermen of Grado, who remained in the lagoon for a long time, returning to the island of Grado only during the colder period of the year.  

Once mainly a fishing centre, today it is a popular tourist destination, known commonly as L'Isola del Sole ("The Sunny Island"). It is also famous because it is a spa town; from 1873 a maritime hospice for children called Ospizio Marino wanted by the doctor Giuseppe Barellai was established on the island, because the climate and the environment of the island are a good place for the treatment of some childhood diseases. Subsequently, Grado was the chosen destination for marine thermal treatments, especially by the Austrian population. Together with Marano Lagunare, it is the centre of the Marano-Grado Lagoon, which is famous for its uncontaminated nature. Grado is the birthplace of Biagio Marin, a poet who sang about the island in the local Venetian dialect.

History

In Roman times the city, known as ad Aquae Gradatae, was the first port for ships entering the Natissa (Natisone), headed upstream to Aquileia.

During the late years of the Western Roman Empire many people fled from Aquileia to Grado in order to find a safer place, more protected from the invasions coming from the east. 

In 452, Nicetas, Bishop of Aquileia, took refuge briefly at Grado; of the same period is the earliest construction of Grado's first cathedral, the first church of Santa Maria delle Grazie, and the baptistery. Grado was the home base of the patriarchate's fleet.

In 568, after the invasion of the Lombards, the seat of the Patriarchate of Aquileia was transferred to Grado by the Patriarch Paulinus. After the Schism of the Three Chapters, two different patriarchs were elected: the patriarch of Grado exerted his jurisdiction over the Latin-origin people living on the coast and in the Venetian Lagoon, while that of Old-Aquileia, later moved to Cividale, had its jurisdiction over the interior. 

A long-lasting dispute over the authority of the two patriarchs ensued. In 993, the patriarch of Aquileia, Popo, conquered Grado but was unable to keep possession of it. The matter was settled only in 1027 when the pope declared the supremacy of the See of Aquileia over Grado and the Venetian province.

The seat of the patriarchate was transferred to Venice in 1451 by Pope Nicholas V. Reduced to a minor hamlet, Grado was sacked by the English, who burned the city archives in 1810 and by the French in 1812. 

Grado was acquired by Austria in 1815, to which it belonged until 1918 when it was ceded to Italy after its victory in World War I.

In the Belvedere area where the land is interrupted and gives way to the lagoon, it was possible to embark to reach the island of Grado. Subsequently, there was a tourist and urban development and in 1905 a road was built in the middle of the lagoon to connect the two parts of the territory. In 1936 Grado was definitively connected to the mainland through the construction of a swing bridge which put an end to the isolation of the island.

Main sights
Today there are frequent finds of inscriptions, sarcophagi, marble sculpture and small bronzes that once furnished its villas. The remains of one of these villas have been excavated on the islet of Gorgo in the lagoon.

Modern landmarks include:
The Basilica of Sant'Eufemia (Cathedral), with the octagonal Baptistry (late 5th century). The church was once preceded by a quadri-portico, one of the columns of which is now in the centre of the Patriarch's Square. The current appearance of the church dates from the reconstruction by Fra Elia (579), with a simple hut façade and a bell tower (15th century) on the right side, which is surmounted by a statue portraying St. Michael and known as the Anzolo (1462). The interior has a nave and two aisles. The main point of interest is the mosaic pavement from the 6th century, restored in 1946–48.
The basilica of Santa Maria delle Grazie. Begun in the 4th to 5th centuries, it was renovated in the 6th century and restored in Baroque in 1640.
The Barbana Sanctuary. It is located in a small island in the Grado Lagoon called Barbana, which can be reached in 25 minutes by motorboat, the service is offered by the boat "Nuova Cristina" from Riva Zaccaria Gregori, Grado.  The original church was erected in 582 and was since rebuilt and enlarged. The current sanctuary was built in Neo-Romantic style and houses numerous vestiges of the buildings that have succeeded each other over the centuries, including two columns that probably date back to the original church. Inside there are very different works: the main altar has a relief with the lagoon surmounted by a wooden statue guarded by an aedicule of the Madonna, a large canvas representing the union of Venetians in a brotherhood, two Venetian altars dedicated to St. Anthony of Padua (on the right) and St. Francis of Assisi (on the left). Furthermore, near the entrance to the bell tower, it is possible to see capitals and marble from the early Middle Ages. 

Of the ancient fortress only a tower, turned into a private residence, and parts of the walls can still be seen. Under the Town Hall are remains of the Palaeo-Christian basilica of Piazza Vittoria.

The Valle Cavanata Nature Reserve is a  protected area situated in the easternmost part of the Grado Lagoon.

Resort town

Today, Grado attracts scores of tourists each year to its hotels and campgrounds.  A large water park run by a municipal corporation is the main attraction, complete with indoor and outdoor swimming pools, and a health centre offering spa treatments.

The town also boasts a well-preserved pedestrian-only centre, in which many shops, bars, and restaurants are located.

Grado also offers facilities for many sporting activities, including tennis, wind-surfing, and golf. From Grado can be done excursions by boat to the Grado Lagoon, and visit the many dozen islands inside it (like Barbana).

Twin towns
 Sankt Lorenzen bei Knittelfeld, Austria
 Sankt Marein-Feistritz, Austria

Image gallery

Bibliography
Bisconti F., Temi di iconografia paleocristiana, Vatican City, 2000.
Bovini G., "Grado paleocristiana", in Archeologia Cristiana, Bologna 1973.
Farioli R., "Mosaici pavimentali dell'alto Adriatico e dell'Africa settentrionale in età bizantina", in Antichità Altoadriatiche, vo. V.paleocristiana, Ravenna 1975.
Farioli R.,  Pavimenti musivi di Ravenna, Ravenna 1975.
Efthalia Rentetzi, "Un'inedita figura di pesce. Parentele stilistiche tra i mosaici pavimentali di s. Maria delle Grazie e s. Eufemia a Grado", in Artonweb. Punti di visa sull'arte.   
Efthalia Rentetzi, "Un frammento inedito di S. Eufemia a Grado. Il pavimento musivo del Salutatorium", in  Arte Cristiana , fasc.. 850 (Gennaio - Febbraio 2009), Volume XCVI, p. 51-52.
Touring Club Italiano, "Gorizia e provincia: Il Collio, la valle dell'Isonzo, Grado e la laguna, il Carso", 2009.
Ezio Marocco, "Grado: guida storico artistica", Bruno Fachin Editore - Trieste.
Italia Nostra - sezione di Udine, "Gli ambienti del Friuli-Venezia Giulia: LA LAGUNA", 1990.
Graziano Benedetti, "Lagune del Friuli-Venezia Giulia: itinerari, tradizioni & antichi sapori. Alla scoperta di una natura affascinante.", in LEGUIDE MAGNUS, 1994.

Notes

See also
 List of islands of Italy
 Marano Lagunare
 Grado Lagoon
 Friuli-Venezia Giulia
 Battle of Grado

External links
 Official institutional website of City
 Official tourist website of City
 Scuola Insieme, a local Italian language school, offers details on history, travel, and activities in and around Grado.
 Richard Stillwell, ed. Princeton Encyclopedia of Classical Sites, 1976: "Ad Aquas Gradatas (Grado), Italy"
Information about Grado

Cities and towns in Friuli-Venezia Giulia